Adrià Arnaus Antúnez (born 17 October 1994) is a Spanish professional golfer who plays on the European Tour. He won the 2022 Catalunya Championship on the European Tour.

Amateur career
Arnaus attended Texas A&M University from 2012 to 2016. He had a successful year in 2017, winning the Spanish Amateur Championship and being a member of the Spanish team that won the European Amateur Team Championship. He played on the 2017 Alps Tour as an amateur and won two events, the Villaverde Open and the Alps Tour Grand Final which together with two runner-up finishes meant he led to Order of Merit to earn a place on the Challenge Tour for 2018.

Professional career
Arnaus turned professional in late 2017 and reached the final stage of the European Tour Q-School. He had a successful first year as a professional, playing mostly on the Challenge Tour. He won the end-of-season Challenge Tour Grand Final by a stroke from Victor Perez to finish second in the Order of Merit and earn a place on the 2019 European Tour. Earlier in the season he was runner-up to Jack Singh Brar in the Cordon Golf Open and also had a third-place finish and was fourth a further three times.

Arnaus claimed his first European Tour victory at the 2022 Catalunya Championship. He shot a final-round 65 to meet Oliver Bekker in a playoff. He won with a par on the sixth extra hole.

Amateur wins
2010 Campeonato de Catalunya Junior, Spanish Under 16 Closed
2012 Catalonian Junior Championship
2013 Campeonato del Vallès
2014 Copa de Andalucia
2016 Copa de la Comunidad Valenciana, Campeonato de Catalunya Absoluto
2017 Campeonato de España Amateur

Source:

Professional wins (4)

European Tour wins (1)

European Tour playoff record (1–2)

Challenge Tour wins (1)

Alps Tour wins (2)

Results in major championships
Results not in chronological order in 2020.

CUT = missed the half-way cut
"T" = tied
NT = No tournament due to COVID-19 pandemic

Team appearances
Amateur
European Boys' Team Championship (representing Spain): 2011 (winners), 2012
European Amateur Team Championship (representing Spain): 2015, 2017 (winners)

See also
2018 Challenge Tour graduates

References

External links
 
 
 
 
 

Spanish male golfers
Olympic golfers of Spain
Golfers at the 2020 Summer Olympics
Texas A&M Aggies men's golfers
Golfers from Catalonia
Sportspeople from Barcelona
1994 births
Living people
20th-century Spanish people
21st-century Spanish people